Joel Rogers is the name of:
Joel Rogers, academic and political activist
Joel Augustus Rogers (1880–1966), Jamaican-American author, journalist, and historian
Joel Townsley Rogers (1896–1984), writer